Diego de Nicuesa (died 1511) was a Spanish conquistador and explorer.

Background
Diego arrived Santo Domingo in April 1502, with Nicolás de Ovando y Cáceres' flotilla.

In 1506, Nicuesa was given the job of governing Costa Rica, but ran aground off the coast of Panama. He made his way north overland, against resistance from the native population. The combination of guerrilla warfare and tropical disease killed half his expedition before he gave up.

In 1508, Diego de Nicuesa received a land grant at Veragua from Ferdinand II of Aragon, the Spanish monarch. He became founder and governor of Castilla de Oro, in what is now Panama, one of the first two Spanish settlements on the American mainland.

Final events and disappearance
In 1510 he founded the colony of Nombre de Dios. The colony suffered from hunger, hostile natives, and illness, and was ultimately saved by the arrival of Colmenares, a companion who was coming after with supplies. The party abandoned the colony to sail to the more prosperous colony of Santa María la Antigua del Darién, which had been established by the conquistador Vasco Núñez de Balboa without the knowledge of Nicuesa. Informed by Colmenares of the new colony established within the borders of his territory, he headed to the colony to punish the colonists and take possession of it. But the colonists of Santa Maria were warned of the governor's intent and denied him entry. While most of Nicuesa's men were granted the right to stay in Balboa's colony, Nicuesa and 17 loyal followers were put out to sea. Nicuesa headed for the Santo Domingo, but the ship disappeared and he was never seen again.

See also
List of people who disappeared mysteriously at sea

References

1510s missing person cases
1511 deaths
16th-century explorers
16th-century Spanish people
Deaths by drowning
People lost at sea
Royal Governors of Panama
Spanish city founders
Spanish conquistadors
Year of birth unknown